Fifty-eight Guggenheim Fellowships were awarded in 1938.

1938 U.S. and Canadian Fellows

1938 Latin American and Caribbean Fellows

See also
 Guggenheim Fellowship
 List of Guggenheim Fellowships awarded in 1937
 List of Guggenheim Fellowships awarded in 1939

References

1938
1938 awards